is a former Japanese football player.

Playing career
Sambonsuge was born in Kamakura on June 5, 1978. After graduating from high school, he joined J1 League club Urawa Reds based in his local in 1997. However he could not play at all in the match until 1999. In 2000, he moved to newly was promoted to J2 League club, Mito HollyHock. However he could not play at all in the match. In 2001, he moved to J2 club Ventforet Kofu. He played many matches as center back. In 2002, he moved to Regional Leagues club Gunma FC Horikoshi (later FC Horikoshi). The club was promoted to Japan Football League from 2004. Although he played as regular player in 2004, he could not play at all in the match in 2005. In September 2005, he moved to Regional Leagues club Matsumoto Yamaga FC. He played as regular player in 5 seasons and the club was promoted to JFL from 2010. However he moved to Regional Leagues club Nara Club without playing in JFL in 2010. He played as regular player in 3 season. In 2013, he moved to Regional Leagues club Arterivo Wakayama. He played many matches and retired end of 2016 season.

Club statistics

References

External links

alwin.org

1978 births
Living people
People from Kamakura
Association football people from Kanagawa Prefecture
Japanese footballers
J1 League players
J2 League players
Japan Football League players
Urawa Red Diamonds players
Mito HollyHock players
Ventforet Kofu players
Arte Takasaki players
Matsumoto Yamaga FC players
Nara Club players
Arterivo Wakayama players
Association football defenders